Mile Knežević (born September 21, 1971) is a retired Serbian professional football player. Mile Knezevic is at the moment a multimillionaire businessman working in Serbia and Austria.

Career
born in Yugoslav and Serbian capital Belgrade, during his playing career he played for clubs from many different countries: FK Rad and FK Zvezdara in his home country, K.S.V. Waregem in Belgium, Puebla F.C. in Mexico, Panserraikos F.C. in Greece, Spartak Varna in Bulgaria and Garbarnia Szczakowianka Jaworzno in Poland.

After retiring in the early 2000s, he decided to start a coaching career being, in 2009, the Sports Director of FK Internacional, a minor football club from Belgrade. Before he had been the manager of the youth team of FK Zvezdara.

References

External links
 
 

Living people
1971 births
Footballers from Belgrade
Serbian footballers
Association football defenders
FK Rad players
FK Zvezdara players
First League of Serbia and Montenegro players
Expatriate footballers in Belgium
Liga MX players
Club Puebla players
Expatriate footballers in Mexico
Football League (Greece) players
Panserraikos F.C. players
Expatriate footballers in Greece
PFC Spartak Varna players
First Professional Football League (Bulgaria) players
Expatriate footballers in Bulgaria
Szczakowianka Jaworzno players
Ekstraklasa players
Expatriate footballers in Poland
Serbian expatriate sportspeople in Bulgaria
Serbian expatriate sportspeople in Poland